Mushtum (fist in Uzbek) is an Uzbek satire and humor magazine published since 1923. It was founded by Abdulla Qodiriy. In 1927, the magazine began to cooperate with the Krokodil, a similar Russian magazine. Mushtum has been a starting point and an aegis of many Uzbek authors, including Abdulla Qahhor, Erkin Vohidov, Gʻafur Gʻulom, Said Ahmad, Asqad Muxtor and Mirmuhsin.

During the Soviet era, Mushtum was published by printing house of the Central Committee. Since the Soviet dissolution, the magazine has been published by Sharq Publishing House.

References

External links 
 Sharq's Mushtum page

Humor magazines
Magazines established in 1923
Mass media in Tashkent
Magazines published in Uzbekistan
1923 establishments in the Soviet Union
Magazines published in the Soviet Union